Hoërskool Alberton is a Dual-medium high school in Florentia, Alberton, South Africa. The school has approximately 800 learners.On Tuesday, Oct. 12, 1948, the books, furniture, and other supplies in use in the middle section of the Kruger School were transferred to the new junior high school in Alberton. The first principal, P.F. Erasmus, opened the school with nine teachers and 183 pupils.

The school was officially opened on Feb. 24, 1949 by the Administrator of the Transvaal, Dr. W Nicol. In 1954, the junior high school became a full-fledged high school with ten pupils in standard ten. Improvements were made to the existing buildings in 1954 and 1959.

From 1960 to 1975, Mr. J.J. le Roux was head of the school. From 1976 to August 1994 Dr. P. Krynauw was the principal. From August 1994 - 2016, Mr. H.J. Schoeman has served as principal. Since 2017, Mr. J Jordaan has taken over the reigns as principal

References 

High schools in South Africa
Afrikaans-language schools
Schools in Gauteng